{{speciesbox
|name = 
|image = Daviesia elongata.jpg
|image_caption = Between Tarin Rock and Lake Grace
|status_system = DECF
|status = P3
|genus = Daviesia
|species = implexa
|authority = Crisp
|synonyms_ref = 
|synonyms = "Davies elongata subsp. implexa Crisp
}}Daviesia implexa is a species of flowering plant in the family Fabaceae and is endemic to the south-west of Western Australia. It is a mound-shaped shrub with many tangled stems, scattered linear phyllodes and yellow or apricot-coloured, reddish-brown and yellowish-green flowers.

The sepals are joined at the base, the upper two lobes joined for most of their length and the lower three pointed.

Taxonomy and naming
This species was first formally described in 1995 by Michael Crisp and given the name Daviesia elongata subsp. implexa in Australian Systematic Botany from specimens collected near Lake Grace in 1983. In 2017, Crisp raised the subspecies to species status as Daviesia implexa in the journal Phytotaxa. The specific epithet (implexa) means "interwoven or entwined".

Distribution and habitatDaviesia implexa grows in kwongan between Kulin and Hyden in the Coolgardie, Jarrah Forest and Mallee regions of south-western Western Australia.

Conservation statusDaviesia implexa'' is classified as "Priority Three" by the Government of Western Australia Department of Biodiversity, Conservation and Attractions, meaning that it is poorly known and known from only a few locations but is not under imminent threat.

References

implexa
Eudicots of Western Australia
Plants described in 1995
Taxa named by Michael Crisp